Elizabeth Beaumont may refer to:

Elizabeth Beaumont (writer) ( 1576–1651), English writer and peeress
Betty Beaumont (born 1946), Canadian-American artist